Livingston may refer to:

Businesses
 Livingston Energy Flight, an Italian airline (2003–2010)
 Livingston Compagnia Aerea, an Italian airline (2011–2014), also known as Livingston Airline
 Livingston International, a North American customs broker
 Livingston Recording Studios, a recording studio in North London UK
 The Livingston Group, an American lobbying firm

Education

 Livingston Campus (Rutgers University), a sub-campus of Rutgers University's New Brunswick/Piscataway area campus
 Livingston College, New Jersey, United States, a former residential college of Rutgers on the Livingston Campus
 Livingston University, former name (1967–1995) of the University of West Alabama
 Livingston High School (disambiguation)

Places

Antarctica 
 Livingston Island in the South Shetland Islands
 Camp Livingston (Antarctica), an Argentine seasonal base camp

Australia 
 County of Livingstone, Queensland

Canada 
 Rural Municipality of Livingston No. 331, Saskatchewan

Guatemala 
 Livingston, Guatemala, a town

United Kingdom
 Livingston, West Lothian, a town
 Livingston (Scottish Parliament constituency)
 Livingston (UK Parliament constituency)
 Livingston Village, West Lothian

United States
 Livingston, Alabama, a city
 Livingston, California, a city
 Livingston, Georgia, a ghost town
 Livingston, Illinois, Madison County, a village
 Livingston, Clark County, Illinois, an unincorporated community
 Livingston, Kentucky, a home rule-class city
 Livingston, Louisiana, a town and the seat of Livingston Parish
 Livingston, Montana, a town
 Livingston, Mississippi an unincorporated community
 Livingston, New Jersey, a township
 Livingston, New York, a town; also a hamlet in the town
 Livingston, Ohio, a ghost town
 Livingston, South Carolina, a town
 Livingston, Staten Island, a name sometimes applied to the northeastern portion of the neighborhood of West Brighton
 Livingston, Tennessee, a town
 Livingston, Texas, a town
 Livingston, West Virginia, an unincorporated community
 Livingston, Wisconsin, a village
 Lake Livingston, Texas

Military
 Camp Livingston, Louisiana, a US Army camp during World War II
 Fort Livingston, Louisiana, a 19th-century coastal defense fort
 , a World War II cargo ship

Sports
 Livingston Open, a former tennis tournament (1984–1989)
 Livingston (basketball), a Scottish basketball club
 Livingston F.C., a Scottish football club
 Livingston RFC, a Scottish rugby union club

People
 Livingston (surname)
 Livingston (given name)

Other uses
 Lord Livingston, a former title in the Peerage of Scotland
 Livingston (band)
 Livingston (film), 2016
 Livingston station (disambiguation)
 Livingston Award, a University of Michigan journalism award
 Livingston, the pet lionfish kept in a spherical aquarium in the Ready Room of Captain Picard, in the television show Star Trek: The Next Generation

See also
 Livingston County (disambiguation)
 Livingston Parish, Louisiana
 Livingstone (disambiguation)